Robert Stormonth Darling (6 June 1880 – 20 May 1956) was a Scottish first-class cricketer.

The son of Patrick Stormonth Darling, he was born at Kelso in June 1880. He was educated at Winchester College, before going up to Oriel College, Oxford. While studying at Oxford, he played first-class cricket for Oxford University, making his debut against H. D. G. Leveson-Gower XI at Oxford in 1902. He played first-class cricket for Oxford until 1903, making ten appearances. In these ten matches, Darling scored 188 runs at an average of 11.75 and a high score of 54. With the ball, he took 3 wickets.

Darling served in the First World War with the Lothians and Border Horse, holding the temporary rank major in August 1916. He was later employed as the joint manager of the Kelso branch of the Bank of Scotland. He died suddenly at Kelso in May 1956. His son-in-law, Derrick Bailey, also played first-class cricket.

References

External links

1880 births
1956 deaths
20th-century Scottish businesspeople
Alumni of Oriel College, Oxford
British Army personnel of World War I
Cricketers from Kelso
Lothians and Border Horse officers
Oxford University cricketers
People educated at Winchester College
Scottish bankers
Scottish cricketers